The 1925 Auckland City mayoral election was part of the New Zealand local elections held that same year. In 1925, elections were held for the Mayor of Auckland plus other local government positions including twenty-one city councillors. The polling was conducted using the standard first-past-the-post electoral method. As part of the elections, ratepayers voted on loan schemes to the value of £ NZ750,000, the largest of which (£ NZ340,000) was for the proposed Auckland Civic Centre. The Auckland Civic Centre was supported by the outgoing mayor and those city councillors who stood for re-election, plus George Baildon who won the mayoralty. Baildon's opponent, Harold Schmidt, was an opponent of the loan. The voters were happy to support those candidates who supported the scheme but they did not approve the loan and the scheme did not go ahead.

Mayoralty results

Councillor results

References

Mayoral elections in Auckland
1925 elections in New Zealand
Politics of the Auckland Region
1920s in Auckland